The  is a museum in Komaba, Meguro, Tokyo, Japan, dedicated to the hand-crafted art of ordinary people (mingei).Access is from Komaba-Tōdaimae Station of Keio Inokashira Line.

The museum was established in 1936 by Yanagi Sōetsu, the founder of the mingei movement; Hamada Shōji succeeded him as its director. Yanagi and Hamada officially announced their desire to establish a folk crafts museum in 1926. Construction began on the museum in 1935 and was completed in 1936.

The museum covers 1,818 square meters and was constructed with a traditional Japanese architectural style. A 'long' stone-roofed gate-cum-residence (nagaya-mon) was brought from the Tochigi Prefecture and reconstructed in front of the building.

See also
 Tomimoto Kenkichi Memorial Museum
 Folk Cultural Properties
 Japanese handicrafts

References

External links 
 Official site 

Art museums and galleries in Tokyo
Folk art museums and galleries in Japan
Art museums established in 1936
1936 establishments in Japan
Buildings and structures in Meguro
Mingei